Endless Love is the unofficial title for a set of four Korean drama series directed by Yoon Seok-ho, produced by KBS from 2000 to 2006.

Structure 
It featured four parts, with each named after the seasons of the year. Each part of the series had its own plotlines, characters, and actors. The series was widely viewed in Asia and continued the Korean Wave that had gripped the region since the late 1990s and early 2000s. Later on, as the series progressed and was marketed outside of Korea, the moniker 'Endless Love' stuck and was used to identify all the series as one.

Endless Love series 
The series was widely known in South Korea as director Yoon Seok-ho's pet project, dealing with four different seasons of love. In Korea, however, it is not totally put together as a series but is arranged as four separate shows. All the seasons run 20 episodes except for the first which ran only 16 as they were shown on KBS2, in more than 76 episodes. The show's endings not only have evolved with the times (tragedy used to be the trend, but now lighter, happier endings are preferred), but have kept with the theme, getting progressively more positive as 'spring' approaches. A few of the actors who portray the show's supporting characters return in different roles as the series progressed, such as Kim Hae-sook, but only Song Seung-heon played two different characters, both as leads for Autumn and Summer.

Here are the four parts of the 'series':
 Autumn in My Heart
 Winter Sonata
 Summer Scent
 Spring Waltz

Running similarities 
Many elements of the 'formula' of Korean drama are evident in the shows, but are retained even more clearly in all four shows.

The shows mainly begin with a love that began at some point in the early childhood or teen years and continues on until adulthood, usually after a long separation. This is slightly bent in the 3rd series as the main character's first loves are not the main characters, but still goes by 'first love' involving the heart of the main male character's first girlfriend having been transplanted onto the main female lead.

The shows also seem to emphasize the scenery, making it into one of the main characters (the rice fields in Autumn, the lake in Winter, the tea garden in Summer and the island in Spring).

The show also follows a pattern of having a 'third-wheel', the second male lead; and the jealous girl, the second female lead. There was also a 3rd 'couple' in each show, mostly to provide comic relief from the otherwise dreary situations presented in each show (leading to 3 couples- the leads, the second leads and the 'funny' couple).

Also, all the characters in all the series have had the leads endure the disagreement of the parents of both leads. As for the soundtrack, main instrumental themes for all the series are known classics such as 'Romance' in Autumn, 'Moonlight Sonata' in Winter, 'Serenade' in Summer and 'Clementine' in Spring.

Broadcasting outside Korea
In the Philippines, Endless Love: Autumn in My Heart became a tearful and heart-touching drama. This drama received much positive feedback. Also the main actor and actress' of the first series garnered positive comments from people. Endless Love II: Winter Sonata and Endless Love III: Summer Scent also aired on GMA Network, while Endless Love IV: Spring Waltz aired on ABS-CBN as Spring Waltz (without the Endless Love title) and also came out with a DVD Boxset containing all episodes Tagalog Dubbed. Endless Love which was the first adaptation of the first series installment of the same title spanned a remake in 2010 after the original series aired 10 years back it marked the 60 years of GMA Network. The series featured Dingdong Dantes as Johnny and Marian Rivera as Jenny which also became a hit through its initial run.
In Indonesia, the serial was officially broadcast as Endless Love: Autumn in My Heart such:
 Indosiar (2002)
 Start aired: Monday, 1 July 2002
 End aired: Wednesday, 7 August 2002
 Monday and Tuesday at 18:00-19:00 WIB/19:00-20:00 WITA.
 RCTI (2003-2004)
 Live:
 Start aired: Chinese New Year 2003
 End aired: Sunday, 11 May 2003
 Weekends at 15:00-16:00 WIB/16:00-17:00 WITA/17:00-18:00 WIT.
 Rerun:
 Start aired: Tuesday, 16 November 2004
 End aired: Thursday, 23 December 2004
 Weekdays at 18:00-19:00 WIB/19:00-20:00 WITA/20:00-21:00 WIT.
 Deli TV Medan (2006)
 Start aired: Monday, 1 May 2006
 End aired: Wednesday, 9 June 2006
 Weekdays at 20:00-21:00 WIB.
 Dubbed (Audio): Korean.
 Subtitle (Captions): Indonesian.
 ANTV (2012)
 Start aired: Monday, 29 October 2012
 End aired: Friday, 7 December 2012
 Weekdays at 20:30-21:30 WIB/21:30-22:30 WITA/22:30-23:30 WIT.
In Puerto Rico, Endless Love II: Winter Sonata and Endless Love IV: Spring Waltz run with Spanish dubbing, and the two are currently being broadcast at the same time. They have gained much popularity with their viewers.

Production and telecasting 
Telecasting: KBS
Executive Producer: Kim, Jong Sik
Chief Producer: Moon, Bo Hyun
Producer: Lee, Jae Sang
Production: YOON'S COLOR
Director: Yoon Seok-ho
Distributor: YOON'S COLOR

Soundtracks

Korean soundtracks
Autumn Tale soundtrack
Also includes a compact disc for another Korean KBS show - Fireworks. The main title and "Reason" have the same melody and are the dominant themes of the show. "Romance", also known as "Forbidden Love" is the classic piece used for this soundtrack.

 Main Title (Flute ver.)
 Reason - Jung Il-young
 Romance - Choi Tae-won
 Gi do (Prayer) - Jung Il-won 
 Remember - Park Jung-won
 Uhl Ma Na Nae Ga (Sincerely) - Yoon Chang-gun
 Reason (Instrumental ver.)
 Romance (Piano ver.) - Lee Hong-rae 
 Noon Mool (Tears) - Lee Hong-rae
 Uhl Ma Na Nae Ga (Sincerely) (Guitar ver.) - Guitar by Ham Choon-ho
 Ggoom suhk ae suh (In my dream) - Jung Il-young
 Uhl Ma Na Nae Ga (Sincerely) (Piano ver.) - Piano by Yoo Jung-young
 Gi Do (Prayer) (Piano ver.)

Autumn Tale: Episode 1
 Romance (Instrumental) - Choi Tae Wan
 Sadness - Jung Chul In
 Crying - Jung Chul In
 Ja Jun Guh (Instrumental) - Jung Chul In
 Chun Nyun Dong Ahn - Jung Chul In
 I Love You, I Miss You, I Need You - Jung Chul In
 Epilogue (Instrumental) - Jung Chul In
 Nuh Eh Ge Mood Go Ship Eun Doo Ga Ji - Kim Soo Jin
 Bi Ae (Instrumental) - Jung Chul In
 Seul Peun Ye Gam - Lim Ok Moon
 Ja Yoo Rob Ge - Jung Chul In
 Sad Song - Kim Sang Hee, Kang Sung Gon
 Cafe Christman - Kim Yo Seb
 Gyuh Ool Ae Sang - Song Ji Hyun
 Sadness (Instrumental) - Jung Chul In

Winter Sonata soundtrack
Predominantly features Ryu (류) as the official performer for Winter Sonata.

처음부터 지금까지 Cheoeumbuteo Jigeumkkaji (From the Beginning Until Now) - performed by Ryu
"My Memory" - performed by Ryu
처음 Cheoeum (First Time)
그대만이 Geudaeman'i (Only You) - performed by Ryu
처음부터 지금까지 Cheoeumbuteo Jigeumkkaji (From the Beginning Until Now) - instrumental version
"My Memory" - piano and violin version
보낼 수 없는 사랑 Ponael Su Eobsneun Sarang (The Love I Can Not Send) - performed by Seon (선)
시작 Shijak (The Beginning)
그대만이 Geudaeman'i (Only You) - piano and violin version
"My Memory" - piano version
잊지마 Itjima (Don't Forget) - performed by Ryu
기억속으로 Gieoksog'euro (Inside the Memories)
연인 Yeon'in (Lover) - performed by Ryu
제비꽃 Jebikkoch (Violet) - performed by Ryu
그대만이 Geudaeman'i (Only You) - piano version
처음 Cheoeum (First Time) - piano version
제비꽃 Jebikkoch (Violet) - instrumental

In addition, "Moment" performed by Ryu and available on his album Ryu 2 (류 2집) is included on some bootleg versions of the Winter Sonata soundtrack.

Winter Sonata Classics
 Chuh eum boo tuh ji geum gga ji - Oh Suk Joon, Yoo Hae Joon
 Tears In Your Eyes - Park Jung Won
 My Memory (Violin Version) - Park Jung Won
 Ye gam - Ho, Lee
 Ha yan yun in deul - Francis Lai
 Ah jik do - Lee Ji Soo
 Missing You (Violin Version) - Ho, Lee
 Sparks - Moszkowski
 Goodbye My Love - Ho, Lee
 My Memory (Piano Version) - Park Jung Won
 Bit ba raen gi uk - Lee Ji Soo
 Love Is Blue - Ho, Lee
 Missing You (Piano Version) - Ho, Lee
 Byul - Ha Kwang Suk
 Let's Dream, Once Again - Ho, Lee

Winter Sonata Orgel Sound Collection
 My Memory
 Shi jak
 Ah jik do
 Chuh eum boo tuh ji geum gga ji
 Goodbye My Love
 Bit ba raen gi uk
 Love Is Blue
 Byul
 Chuh eum
 Je bi ggot
 Moment
 Geu dae man ee
 Gi uk sok eu ro
 Bo nael soo uhb neun sarang
 It ji ma

Summer Scent soundtrack
The main title and Bi Mil are interchangeably used in different airings of the show as the main theme.

 Main Title (Serenade)
 Bi mil - Jung In Ho
 Missing U - Seo Jin Young
 Uh jjuh myun - Seo Jin Young
 Yuh reum hyang gi - Jung In Ho
 Serenade (Inst.) (Guitar)
 Second Romance - Seo Jin Young
 Yuh reum hyang gi 2 (Inst.)
 Doo bun jjae sarang - Seo Jin Young
 Uh jjuh myun (Inst.) (Piano)
 Serenade - Yoo Mi Sook
 Bi mil (Inst.) (Piano)
 Doo bun jjae sarang (Inst.) (Piano & Guitar)
 Love - Seo Jin Young
 Bi mil (Inst.) (Guitar)
 Sarang han da myun - Jung In Ho & Seo Jin Young
 Yuh woo bi (Inst.)
 Love (Inst.) (Piano & Guitar)

Spring Waltz soundtrack
 Teardrop Waltz
 One Love - Loveholic
 Childhood
 Cannonball - Damien Rice
 Clementine - Lee Ji Soo
 Flower - U-na
 Bom eh waltz
 Nae in saeng eh bom nal - S Jin
 A Sad Memory - Jang Se Yong
 Ee jen sarang hal soo it suh yo - Yurisangja
 Shadow Waltz - Jang Se Yong
 Moo ji gae - Bada
 Song Of Island - Lee Ji Soo
 Soo ho chun sa - S Jin
 Flashback
 Ma eum eu ro boo reu neun no rae - Myung In Hee
 Tears For Remembrance

Spring Waltz Classics
Spring Waltz - Yoon Jae Ha

A double-disc piano collection packaged exactly like the male lead character's first Korean special release album, also bearing that character's name.

CD 1
 Bom eh waltz (Spring Waltz) (Piano Version) - Yiruma
 Day Dream - Park Jong Hoon
 Sunday Afternoon Waltz - Park Jong Hoon
 Sum eh ee ya gi (Dreaming Island's Story) (Piano Version) - Yiruma
 Il uh buh rin sum (Lost In Island) (Piano Version) - Yiruma
 A Sad Motive - Park Jong Hoon
 Broken Blossoms (Vivace) - Yiruma
 To My Little Girl I (Clementine) - Yiruma
 I Think You Love Me - Park Jong Hoon
 Byul ee ji gi jun eh (Before The Star) - Yiruma
 Sum eh ee ya gi" (Dreaming Island's Story) (Clarinet Solo by Hee Jeong Lucia Kye) - Yiruma
 Ga eul eul dalm eun bom I (Autumn-Colored Spring I) (Guitar Solo By Minseok Kim) - Yiruma
 Men's Tears (Cello By Huh Yun Jung) - Park Jong Hoon
 Ga eul eul dalm eun bom II (Autumn-Colored Spring II) (Piano & Guitar Version) - Yiruma
 Il uh buh rin sum (Lost In Island) (String Version) (Cello By Huh Yun Jung) - Yiruma
 Silence - Park Jong Hoon
 Nuh eh dwit mo seub - Park Jong Hoon
 To My Little Girl II (Clementine) - Yiruma
 Guten Morgen - Park Jong Hoon
 Bom eh waltz (Spring Waltz) (String Version) (Clarinet By Hee Jeong Lucia Kye) - Yiruma
 To My Little Girl III (Clementine) (Bonus Track) - Yiruma
 Il uh buh rin sum (Lost In Island) (Free Version) (Bonus Track) - Yiruma

CD 2
 Chopin, Nocturne in C # minor - Kim Jong Won
 Schumann, Humoreske - Kim Jong Won
 Chopin, Waltz in B minor - Kim Jong Won
 Chopin, Prelude in E minor, Op. 28-4 - Kim Jong Won
 Chopin, Etude in E major, op. 10-3 'Chanson de l'adieu' - Kim Jong Won
 Tchaikovsky, 'Autumn Song' - Kim Jong Won
 Chopin, Nocturne in E♭major, op. 9-2 - Kim Jong Won
 Chopin, Etude in E♭minor, op. 10-6 - Kim Jong Won
 Chopin, Prelude in D♭Major, op. 28-15 'Raindrop' - Kim Jong Won
 Tchaikovsky, Nocturne in C# minor - Kim Jong Won

Love Poem
A maxi-single released with songs inspired by Spring Waltz.

 Love Poem
 Flying Petals
 Nocturne For Clementine
 Ggoom sok eh suh
 Love Poem (Piano Solo)
 Ggoom sok eh suh (Piano Solo)
 Flying Petals (Piano Duet)

International releases
Winter Sonata Piano Classic Version (Japan)
 Saisho kara ima made
 My Memory
 Yokan
 Shiroi koibitotachi
 Ima demo
 Missing You
 Sparks
 Goodbye My Love
 Love Is Blue
 Hajimete
 Anata dake ga
 Moment
 Koibito
 Hajimari
 Kioku no naka e
 Wasurenai go
 Sumire
 Hanasenai koi
 Let's Dream, Once Again

Winter Sonata overseas edition soundtrack
Includes the single 'Moment' by Ryu which while being a major theme in the show was not included in the original album but was only released with Ryu's album by the same name.

 Chuh eum boo tuh ji geum gga ji (From the Beginning Til Now) - Ryu
 My Memory - Ryu
 It ji ma (Don’t Forget Me) - Ryu
 Moment - Ryu
 Geu dae man ee (For You) - Ryu
 My Memory (Chinese Version)
 Chuh eum boo tuh ji geum gga ji (From the Beginning Til Now) - (instrumental)
 My Memory (Piano Ver.)
 Chuh eum (First time) 
 My Memory (piano)
 Let’s Dream Once Again
 When Love Fails 
 Geu dae man ee (For You) – (piano)
 Stepping On a Rainy Street 
 Geu dae man ee (For You) – (violin and piano)

Summer Scent overseas edition soundtrack
Contains all of the tracks of the original plus 'Neowi Hyangii' (Your Scent), an instrumental piece of 'YuhReum Hyanggi (Say Yes). 'YuhReum Hyanggi' was also retitled as 'Neowi Hyanggi'.

 bi mil - Jung In Ho
 uh jjuh myun - Seo Jin Young
 doo bun jjae sarang - Seo Jin Young
 nowi hyanggi (yuh reum hyang gi) - Jung In Ho
 Love - Seo Jin Young
 Second Romance - Seo Jin Young
 sarang han da myun - Jung In Ho & Seo Jin Young
 Serenade - Yoo Mi Sook
 doo bun jjae sarang (Inst.) (Piano & Guitar)
 bi mil (Inst.) (Guitar)
 uh jjuh myun (Inst.) (Piano)
 Main Title (Serenade)
 Love (Inst.) (Piano & Guitar)
 neowi hyanggi - (inst.)*
 saranghanda myeon (inst.) (piano)*
 yuh woo bi (Inst.)
 yuh reum hyang gi 2 (Inst.)
 bi mil (Inst.) (Piano)
 Serenade (Inst.) (Guitar)

Filipino soundtracks
Endless Love: The Original Soundtrack

The first album to bear the name 'Endless Love' and  be labeled 'original soundtrack' at once. While it contains a lot of musical cues for Autumn Tale, they were not used in the show but seemed to be similar in theme to those used in the Korean album. 'Paglisan', a soprano piece and the 'Endless Love Theme' were songs included here and used in the show. Both songs, along with all the music in the album were composed and arranged by the local Filipino composer Paulo Almaden. The Philippine version of the main title theme is not present in this album.

 Endless Love Theme – Lara Morena
 Reminiscing
 Destiny
 My Romance
 Endless Love Orchestra
 Lonely Waters
 The Road Home
 Autumn In My Heart
 Autumn Scent
 Cry
 Keep this Love Alive – Joanne Gracella
 Hiram – Anton Diva
 In My Arms 
 Paglisan – Elaine Lee

Endless Love: The Album
Features remakes of all three songs from the Korean soundtrack (including the main theme) and songs inspired by Autumn Tale. The outer packaging (box) is white while the inner packaging (a booklet w/ photos which holds the CD) is blue, which is a reversal of the second album's colors. Both were released simultaneously.

 Ikaw – Carmela Cuneta (remade from 'Reason' which was the main theme)
 Alay Sa Yo - Carmela Cuneta
 Pangako Sa Yo – Carmela Cuneta
 Umibig Na – Anne Jomeo (remade from 'Ul Mana Nae Ga')
 Habang Buhay – Anne Jomeo
 The One – Anne Jomeo
 Kahit Na – Raine (remade from 'gi do')
 Pagbigyan Muli – Raine
 Tala – Raine
 Forever – Rayne

Endless Love II Winter Sonata: The Album
Features remakes of the main theme from the Korean soundtrack of Winter Sonata and male and female remakes of 'My Memory'.
The outer packaging (box) is blue while the inner packaging (a booklet w/ photos which holds the CD) is white, which is a reversal of the first album's colors. Both were released simultaneously.

 Di Ko Na Kaya (Strings)
 Di Ko Na Kaya – Carmela Cuneta (remade from chuh eum boo tuh ji geum gga ji and is the main theme)
 Maghihintay Sa Yo - Carmela Cuneta
 My Memory (of Him) – Denise Laurel (remade from 'My Memory')
 My Memory (of Her) – Infuse (remade from 'My Memory')
 Hardin – Infuse
 Lumipad – Sari
 Bakit – Sari
 You Are – Sari
 Di Ko Na Kaya (reprise)
 Kung Kailan Wala Ka Na - Jolina Magdangal

Endless Love III Summer Scent: The Album
Features remakes of all the songs from the Korean soundtrack (including the main theme). The largest remake so far.
The outer packaging (box) is dark green, while the inner packaging (a booklet with photos which holds the CD) is mint green, a unique combination of colors unlike the first two albums.

 Suko na ang Puso - Carmel Cuneta (remade from 'Second Romance', now the new theme)
 Alay Ko - Carmel Cuneta (remade from 'Uh Juh Myun')
 Tuwing Naaalala - Carmel Cuneta
 Pagbabalik - Anne Jomeo (remade from 'Missing You')
 Tanging Pangako - Anne Jomeo (remade from 'Doo Byun Jae Sarang')
 I Know It Better Now - Anne Jomeo
 Hindi Lalayo - Marlon Mercado (remade from 'Bi Mil', which was the original theme)
 Summer Love - Marlon Mercado (remade from 'Yuh Reum Hyanggi')
 Pinagtagpo - Marlon Mercado and Anne Jomeo (remade from 'Saranghanda Myun')
 Suko Na Ang Puso (Instrumental)

Endless Love: The Official Karaoke Collection
A collection of all the songs from Autumn Tale and Winter Sonata including both main themes. The box is a black ridged case with gold embossed logo. This did not include songs from the third series Summer Scent.

Endless Love: The Remix
A collection of all the remade songs from Autumn Tale and Winter Sonata including both main themes. The box can house 4 discs but contains 2. Both sides of the box have different covers for both of the CDs contained.

Acoustic Remix Side,
contains all the remade songs, as well as two original Philippine songs from Autumn In My Heart.

 Ikaw - Carmela Cuneta (remade from 'Reason')
 Di Ko Na Kaya - Carmela Cuneta (remade from chuh eum boo tuh ji geum gga ji
 My Memory (Of Her) - Infuse (remade from 'My Memory')
 Kahit Na - Rayne (remade from 'gi do')
 Tala - Rayne
 Umibig Na - Carmela Cuneta (remade from 'ul ma na naega')
 My Memory (Of Him) - Denise Laurel (remade from 'My Memory')
 Paglisan - Elaine Lee

Club Remix Side
 Ikaw (Blue Skies Mix)
 Di Ko Na Kaya (Tribal Edit)
 My Memory Of Her (Trumpet Breaks Mix)
 Kahit Na (Manila House)
 Tala (Dreamscape Mix)
 Umibig Na (Slow Breaks Mix)
 My Memory Of Him (Wakataw Mix)
 Paglisan (Stealth Mix)
 Bonus Track - Di Ko Na Kaya (Panocha Mix)

There is a theme song of Endless Love: Winter Sonata that is not part of the album with the same name. It is "Kung Kailan Wala Ka Na" which was sung by Jolina Magdangal and heard sometimes in ending credits.

See also
List of Korean television shows
Korean drama
Contemporary culture of South Korea
Yoon Seok-ho

References

External links
Spring Waltz Official Homepage (Korean)
Spring Waltz Official Overview (English)

Korean Broadcasting System television dramas
2000 South Korean television series debuts
2006 South Korean television series endings
Korean-language television shows